"Beer Never Broke My Heart" is a song co-written and recorded by American country music singer Luke Combs. It is Combs's sixth single release to country radio, and the first from his second studio album What You See Is What You Get on Columbia Records Nashville.

History and content
Combs wrote the song with Randy Montana and Jonathan Singleton, and Scott Moffatt was the track's producer. Combs first performed the song acoustically in concert in January 2018.

Taste of Country wrote of the song's lyrical theme, "He sings about everything else in life that can hurt a person, but ultimately comes to the conclusion that beer is the only safe bet!" The song features a list of various things and people that have disappointed the narrator in his life, before concluding in the chorus that "long-neck, ice-cold beer never broke my heart." The song features a guitar riff which was described as owing "as much to hard rock as country" by Rolling Stone reporter Robert Crawford.

Commercial performance
Beer Never Broke My Heart peaked at No. 1 on Billboards Country Airplay chart dated August 4, 2019, which made this Combs' sixth number one on the chart. The song was certified Platinum by the RIAA on October 24, 2019. It has sold 321,000 copies in the United States as of March 2020.

Critical reception
Rolling Stone reporter Robert Crawford described the song as "a country hit for the digital streaming generation, with just enough genre-crossing charm to rope in the city slickers". Stephen Thomas Erlewine, writing for AllMusic, described the song as "a clever drinking anthem that summarizes the bold undercurrents of The Prequel EP quite well."

Music video
The music video was created by TA Films and premiered on CMT and Vevo in 2019. In the video, Combs performs in a small dive bar, similar to gigs he played early in his career. The video also depicts a high school football game between RS Central and East Rutherford, portrayed as a college football game, filmed at RS Central High in Rutherford County, North Carolina.

A 360-degree video was filmed for the song in Tacoma, Washington, and was released in December 2019.

Live performances and other versions
Combs performed the song on The Tonight Show Starring Jimmy Fallon in May 2019, the 2019 CMA Awards in November 2019, and on Saturday Night Live in February 2020.

Charts

Weekly charts

Year-end charts

Certifications

References

2019 songs
2019 singles
Columbia Nashville Records singles
Country rock songs
Luke Combs songs
Songs written by Luke Combs
Songs written by Jonathan Singleton
Songs about alcohol
Songs written by Randy Montana